Lake Roś (Polish: Jezioro Roś, German: Roschsee) is a lake in the Masurian Lake District of the Warmian-Masurian Voivodeship of Poland. This S-shaped glacial lake has an area of 18.9 km2 and a depth of 31.8 metres. The Swięcek and Konopka rivers flow into the lake, while the Pisa River flows out of it. The largest town on the lake is Pisz.

Ros
Ros